Mullayyanagiri is the highest peak in Karnataka, India. Mullayyanagiri is located in the Chandra Dhrona Hill Ranges of the Western Ghats of Chikkamagaluru Taluk. The summit of Mullayanagiri has a small temple and houses a police radio relay station. Seethalayyanagiri is a prominent peak which is adjacent to this place.

Temple 
The peak gets its name from a small temple (gadduge/tomb) at the summit, which is dedicated to a sage "Mulappa swamy" who is believed to have meditated at the caves only a couple of feet below the summit. The caves are accessible and not very deep, they have a direct entrance to the garbagudi of the temple, which is now blocked by the temple priests. Apart from multiple versions of folklore and strong Siddha culture around the belt, the origins or any information about the deity remains ambiguous.

Trekking 
Previously, when the present asphalt roads and the 464 stone and concrete steps were not present, a trail was used to reach the peak, known as 'Sarpadari' or 'Sarpanadi'. Although it is not very frequently visited now, this trail is cherished by trekkers.

See also
 List of peaks in the Karnataka
 Nandi Hills
 Baba Budan giri
 Malnad
 Chamundi Hills
 Kemmangundi
 Kudremukh
 Mangalore
 Nilgiris (mountains)
 Himalayas
 Kodaikanal
 Devaramane
 Munnar

References

External links 
Tours and Trip Packages

Mountains of the Western Ghats
Mountains of Karnataka
Highest points of Indian states and union territories
Geography of Chikkamagaluru district